Fulwith Mill Lane is a particularly wealthy residential street in Harrogate, North Yorkshire. In 2019 it was named as the most expensive road in Yorkshire by property website Zoopla, it is located within the Golden Triangle on the south side of Harrogate. The average house price on Fulwith Mill Lane is 1.7 million.

References

Geography of Harrogate
Streets in England